The cycling competition at the 2014 Central American and Caribbean Games was held in Veracruz, Mexico.

The road cycling tournament was scheduled to be held on 16 and 23 November on the Xalapa-Coatepec Route. The track cycling tournament was scheduled to be held from 17 to 21 November at the Velodrome in Xalapa. The mountain cycling tournament was scheduled to be held on 15 November at the Coatepec Mountain Circuit. The bmx cycling tournament was scheduled to be held on 22 November at Natura park.

Colombia led the medal count with 12 gold medals and 24 total medals.

Medal summary

Road events

Track events

Mountain events

BMX events

Medal table

References

External links
 Official website (in English)

2014 Central American and Caribbean Games events
2014 in cycle racing
2014 in road cycling
2014 in mountain biking
2014 in track cycling
2014 in BMX